Fresco Pictures is a film company, formed in 1996 and based in Los Angeles.  The principals of the corporation are Peter Johnson and science fiction author Orson Scott Card, author of Ender's Game.

Current works in progress are:

Ender's Game
Dogwalker
Feed the Baby of Love
Homebody
Remind Me Again

Fresco Pictures has recently changed its name to Taleswapper.

Film production companies of the United States